The 2003–04 Maltese Premier League (known as the MIA Premier League for sponsorship reasons) was the 24th season of the Maltese Premier League, and the 89th season of top-tier football in Malta. The league started on 22 August 2003 and finished on 9 May 2004. Sliema Wanderers successfully defended last season's league triumph, equalling Floriana's league title record of 25 championships.

Teams 

The following teams were promoted from the First Division at the start of the season:
 Msida Saint-Joseph
 Balzan Youths

From the previous Premier League season, the following teams were relegated to the First Division:
 Marsa
 Mosta

First phase

League table

Results

Second phase

Top Six 

The teams placed in the first six positions in the league table qualified for the Top Six, and the points obtained during the first phase were halved (and rounded up) before the start of second phase. As a result, the teams started with the following points before the second phase: Sliema Wanderers 21 points, Birkirkara 18, Hibernians 17, Marsaxlokk 16, Floriana and Pietà Hotspurs 14.

Play-out 

The teams which finished in the last four league positions were placed in the play-out and at the end of the phase the two lowest-placed teams were relegated to the First Division. The points obtained during the first phase were halved (and rounded up) before the start of second phase. As a result, the teams started with the following points before the second phase: Valletta 12 points, Balzan Youths 9, Msida Saint-Joseph 5 and Ħamrun Spartans 2.

Season statistics

Top scorers

Hat-tricks

Awards

Monthly awards

References

External links 
 Official website

Maltese Premier League seasons
Malta
1